A musical prefix is a numeral or other prefix used in music theory, specifically musical tuning.

See also
Limit (music)
List of pitch intervals

Musical terminology
Musical tuning
Prefixes